Volodymyr Rybak is a Ukrainian name.

 Volodymyr Vasylyovych Rybak, a Ukrainian politician, Chairman of the Verkhovna Rada in 2012-2014, member of Party of Regions.
 Volodymyr Ivanovych Rybak, a Ukrainian city councillor in Horlivka, member of Batkivshchyna, murdered in 2014.